Ivanhoe is a city in Tyler County, Texas, United States. The population was 1,327 at the 2020 census.

In an election held on November 3, 2009, residents voted to incorporate the community as a "Class C" municipality by a vote of 160 to 53. In a concurrent election, Bill Preston was elected unopposed as mayor. A total of eight candidates ran for the two city commissioner positions. Those seats were won by Cathy Bennett and Will Warren.

The incorporation of Ivanhoe coincided with the incorporation of a neighboring community, Ivanhoe North. The creation of both cities was seen as the first step in a process to merge both communities into a single entity, making it the second-largest city in Tyler County.

The merger of both cities to one City of Ivanhoe was approved by a vote of 194 to 60 on November 2, 2010.

Geography
These are 2010 numbers, prior to the merger with Ivanhoe North.

Demographics

As of the 2020 United States census, there were 1,327 people, 706 households, and 391 families residing in the city.

References

External links
Ivanhoe Land of Lakes IPOIA – Ivanhoe Property Owners Improvement Association.
City of Ivanhoe – Official site.

Cities in Tyler County, Texas
Cities in Texas